Amory Nelson Hardy or A.N. Hardy (1835–1911) was a photographer in Boston, Massachusetts, in the 19th century. Portrait subjects included US president Chester A. Arthur, clergyman Henry Ward Beecher, politician James G. Blaine, abolitionist William Lloyd Garrison, doctor Oliver Wendell Holmes Sr., jurist Oliver Wendell Holmes Jr., writer Julia Ward Howe, labor activist Florence Kelley, suffragist Mary Livermore, philanthropist Isabella Somerset, and suffragist Frances Willard. He also made "electric-light portraits" of roller skaters in 1883.

Biography
Hardy was born in Carmel, Maine, son of schoolteacher Benjamin Hardy. He married Angeline S. Davis in 1857 and had three children: Bertha, Grace, and William. As a young man he started a photography business in Lewiston, Maine, before moving to Boston where he kept a studio on Winter Street (c. 1873–1878), Washington Street (c. 1868 and c. 1879–1887), Temple Place, and Tremont Street. He belonged to the National Photographic Association of the United States, the Massachusetts Charitable Mechanic Association, and, outside of his professional life, the Tremont Temple congregation. In 1880 he exhibited photos at the first convention of the Photographers Association of America in Chicago. Hardy worked in Boston during a time when a number of other professional photographers kept studios in the downtown area, including Allen & Rowell, James Wallace Black, Elmer Chickering, William H. Getchell, J.J. Hawes, E.F. Ritz, Antoine Sonrel, and John Adams Whipple.

Collections
Examples of Hardy's work are in the collections of the following institutions:
 Boston Athenaeum
 Boston Public Library
 Dennis Historical Society, Dennis, Massachusetts
 Harvard University
 Hingham Historical Society, Hingham, Massachusetts
 Historic New England
 International Center of Photography
 Massachusetts Historical Society
 New York Public Library 
 US Library of Congress
 US National Portrait Gallery

References

Bibliography
  (About Hardy)

External links

 
 Items related to Hardy via Digital Public Library of America
  (includes info related to A.N. Hardy)
 Flickr. Portrait of Clara Batchelder by Hardy, 202 Washington St., Boston, MA.
 Boston Public Library. Portrait by Hardy. No. 493 Washington Street, artist photographer, Boston, Mass.

Images

Photographers from Massachusetts
American portrait photographers
1835 births
1911 deaths
People from Somerville, Massachusetts
19th century in Boston
19th-century American photographers